Barleeia, or the barleysnails, is a genus of very small sea snails. They are marine gastropod micromollusks in the family Barleeiidae. These snails are usually only a couple of millimeters in length.

Species
Species within the genus Barleeia include:

 Barleeia aemilii (S. Gofas 1995) Cape Verde
 Barleeia albicolor Rolán & Gori, 2014
 Barleeia alderi Carpenter 1856 – West America
 Barleeia annamitica Ph. Dautzenberg. & H. Fischer 1907
 Barleeia bentleyi P. Bartsch 1920 – West America
 Barleeia bifasciata (Carpenter, 1856)
 Barleeia caffra G. B. Sowerby III 1897
 Barleeia cala (E. A. Smith 1890) St. Helena
 Barleeia calcarea E. A. Kay 1979 - Hawaii
 Barleeia californica Bartsch 1920) - California barleysnail - America
 Barleeia carpenteri P. Bartsch 1920 – West-America
 Barleeia chefiae (S. Gofas 1995) Cape Verde
 Barleeia chrysomela Melvill & Standen 1896
 Barleeia cinguloides (S. Gofas 1995) Namibia, Angola.
 Barleeia congenita E. A. Smith 1890
 Barleeia coronadoensis Bartsch, 1920
 Barleeia creutzbergi (K.M. de Jong & H.E. Coomans 1988) Mexico, Costa Rica, Cuba, Curaçao.
 Barleeia ephamilla (E. A. Smith 1890) St. Helena (taxon inquirendum)
 Barleeia fuscaexigua Rolán & Gori, 2014
 Barleeia fuscopicta E.A. Smith 1890
 Barleeia gougati (Michaud 1829) Mediterranean
 Barleeia haliotiphila P. P. Carpenter 1864 - abalone barleysnail - This intertidal snail is one of the most common gastropods to be found in the biotic community at moderate tidal levels. Its diet consists of algae, such as Rhodoglossum affine, Mastocarpus papillatus, Gigartina leptorhynchos. Range: East Pacific, North America.
 Barleeia juliae Rolán & Swinnen, 2004
 Barleeia lindae Rolán & Swinnen, 2004
 Barleeia malgascia Cecalupo & Perugia, 2009
 Barleeia meridionalis (W. F. Ponder. & Worsfold, 1994) Peru
 Barleeia mexicana (Cruz-Abrego 1998) Mexico, Cuba
 Barleeia microthyra (E.C. von Martens 1880) Indo-Pacific
 Barleeia multicolor Rolán & Gori, 2014
 Barleeia oldroydi P. Bartsch 1920
 Barleeia orcutti (P. Bartsch 1920) West America
 Barleeia paupercula (C. B. Adams, 1852)
 Barleeia pervulgata (S. Gofas 1995) Namibia, Angola
 Barleeia picta (S. Gofas 1995) Namibia, Angola
 Barleeia polychroma (de Folin 1870) West America
 Barleeia procera Rolán & Gori, 2014
 Barleeia rubrooperculata (Z.J.A. de Castellanos & F. Fernandes 1972) southern Brazil, Uruguay.
 Barleeia sanjuanensis P. Bartsch 1920
 Barleeia seminulum (T. A. di Monterosato 1877) Europe
 Barleeia simplex (E. A. Smith, 1875)
 Barleeia smithi Bartsch 1915
 Barleeia subtenuis P. P. Carpenter 1864 - Fragile barleysnail - America
 Barleeia taeniolata (S. Gofas 1995) São Tomé and Príncipe
 Barleeia tincta R. J. L. Guppy 1895 - Caribbean barleysnail - eastern Florida, Trinidad.
 Barleeia tomensis (S. Gofas 1995) São Tomé and Príncipe
 Barleeia translucens Rolán & Gori, 2014
 Barleeia trifasciata (T. Habe 1960) Japan
 Barleeia tropica J. Thiele 1925
 Barleeia unifasciata G. Montagu 1803 - Shetland into Mediterranean; Canary Islands
 Barleeia verdensis (S. Gofas 1995) Cape Verde

Species brought into synonymy
 Barleeia acuta P. P. Carpenter 1864 - acute barleysnail - America: synonym of Pseudodiala acuta (Carpenter, 1864)
 Barleeia angustata H.A. Pilsbry 1901 – Indo-Pacific: synonym of Ansola angustata (Pilsbry, 1901)
 Barleeia compacta (J. G. Jeffreys 1884) Europe: synonym of Barleeia gougeti (Michaud, 1830) (junior synonym)
 Barleeia rubra (A. A. Adam, 1795) West Africa: synonym of Barleeia unifasciata (Montagu, 1803)
 Barleeia zeteki (A. M. Strong & L. G. Hertlein 1939) West America: synonym of Barleeia paupercula (C. B. Adams, 1852)

References

 Ponder, W. F. (1967). The classification of the Rissoidae and Orbitestellidae with descriptions of some new taxa. Transactions of the Royal Society of New Zealand, Zoology. 9(17): 193–224, pls 1–13.

External links
 Clark W. (1853). On the Rissoa rubra. Annals and Magazine of Natural History, (2)12: 107-110
 Images from www.gastropods.com
 W. F. (1983). Review of the genera of the Barleeidae (Mollusca: Gastropoda: Rissoacea). Records of the Australian Museum 35: 231-281

Barleeiidae
Gastropod genera